Wild Cattle may refer to:

Feral populations of cattle (Bos taurus); see Cattle#Feral cattle
Certain species of the tribe Bovini
Wild Cattle (film), 1934 film

See also
Cattle (disambiguation)